The Sax Section (subtitled The Jazz Workshop Under the Direction of Al Cohn) is an album by saxophonist composer and arranger Al Cohn recorded in 1956 for the Epic label.

Reception

The AllMusic review by Ken Dryden states, "Al Cohn's writing for small groups is always appealing, and this Epic LP is no exception. Leading three separate groups consisting of various reeds (and no brass) plus a rhythm section, Cohn obtains marvelous results from his groups of all-stars and veteran session musicians".

Track listing
All compositions by Al Cohn except as indicated
 "Shazam" - 2:55
 "The Mellow Side" - 2:36
 "Shutout" - 2:44
 "Double Fracture" - 2:48
 "While My Lady Sleeps" (Bronisław Kaper, Gus Kahn) - 3:15
 "Shorty George" (Count Basie, Andy Gibson) - 2:50
 "The Return of the Red Head" - 3:29
 "Villa Rowboats" - 2:23
 "Solsville" - 3:24
 "Don't Worry 'bout Me" (Rube Bloom, Ted Koehler) - 3:39
 "Blues for the High Brow" - 3:54
 "Tears by Me Out the Heart" - 4:28

Personnel 
Al Cohn - tenor saxophone, arranger
Romeo Penque - clarinet, alto saxophone, oboe, English horn (tracks 3, 5, 8 & 10)
Phil Bodner - flute, clarinet (tracks 3, 5, 8 & 10)
Peanuts Hucko - clarinet (tracks 3, 5, 8 & 10)
Boomie Richman - bass clarinet (tracks 3, 5, 8 & 10)
Charlie O’Kane - flute, bass clarinet (tracks 3, 5, 8 & 10)
Sam Marowitz, Gene Quill - alto saxophone (tracks 1, 4, 9 & 12)
Zoot Sims (tracks 2, 6, 7 & 11), Eddie Wasserman (tracks 1, 2, 4, 6, 7, 9, 11 & 12) - tenor saxophone
Sol Schlinger - baritone saxophone (tracks 1, 2, 4, 5, 7, 9, 11 & 12)
Hank Jones (tracks 2, 6, 7 & 11), Johnny Williams (tracks 1, 3-5, 8-10 & 12) - piano 
Milt Hinton - bass 
Don Lamond (tracks 2, 3, 5-8, 10 & 11), Osie Johnson (tracks 1, 4, 9 & 12) - drums

References 

1956 albums
Epic Records albums
Al Cohn albums